The National Movement for the Liberation of Kosovo was a radical left-wing nationalist political movement in Kosovo during the 90s, as well as a political party after the Kosovo war.

History 
The party was founded as an underground movement on 25 May 1993 in Pristina by a faction of the dissident Marxist-Leninist organization People's Movement of Kosovo (LPK), the founding base of the Kosovo Liberation Army (KLA) guerilla movement. It would derive its name from one of the main core marxist organizations that formed LPK, National-Liberation Movement of Kosovo and other Albanian Regions, founded in February 1978 by Metush Krasniqi, Jusuf Gërvalla and Sabri Novosella. Just like LPK, the LKCK faction advocated the concept of Natural Albania and military action against the Milošević administration, but contrary to the pacifist policies of the dominant Democratic League of Kosovo (LDK) and what it perceived as similar tendencies to moderation inside the LPK. After imprisonment of Avni Klinaku by Yugoslavian authorities, Bahri Fazliu would take charge as the leader. Fazliu would join Kosovo Liberation Army during the war and fall on May 7, 1998, somewhere in the former border between Albania and Yugoslavian Federation. He would later receive the title "Hero of Kosovo".

Political Party 
The LKCK was initially part of the Alliance for the Future of Kosovo, despite the latter's centre-right political position. At the legislative elections held on 24 October 2004, the party boycotted the elections.
As one of the most radical political organizations in Kosovo, the party opposed the Ahtisaari plan and the current presence of the United Nations and European Union in the region, advocating total independence for Kosovo. The party, together with a number of its former leaders, is blacklisted by the U.S. Department of Treasury.

Aftermath 
LKCK would later transform into Movement for Integration and Unification,, with Smajl Latifi as a leader followed by Fadil Fazliu after his resignation, and Movement for Unification of Avni Klinaku, until in May 2011 when two parties merged in one, going on with the Movement for Unification name.

See also 
 Albanian Nationalism
 Albanians in Kosovo
 Kosovo War
 List of Kosovo Albanians
 List of political parties in Kosovo
 Movement for Unification
 People's Movement of Kosovo
 Alliance for the Future of Kosovo
 Ahtisaari Plan

Notes

References

Albanian nationalism in Kosovo
Albanian nationalist parties
Defunct political parties in Kosovo
Hoxhaist parties
Left-wing nationalist parties
Politics of Kosovo
Political organizations based in Kosovo
Socialist parties in Kosovo